AthFest is a free annual music and arts festival in Athens, Georgia, first held in 1997. The festival spans three days in the downtown area during the summer, and planning for the event begins in November. Jared Bailey founded the festival to promote the music of Athens, Georgia; he was formerly of the free alternative weekly Flagpole and the influential early nightclub the 40 Watt Club. In 2009, AthFest became the 501(c)3 non-profit AthFest Educates, which seeks to advance high-quality music and arts education for local youth and the Athens community through direct support of school and community-based programs and events, including an annual music and arts festival. In 2010, AthFest Educates started the annual AthHalf Half Marathon as an additional fundraiser.

The 2020 event, the 24th year of the festival, had been deferred to 2021 due to the COVID-19 pandemic, making it the first time in 23 years that the festival was cancelled. However, in September 2021, the festival was cancelled again for the second year in a row due to continuing concerns of public health from the pandemic.

References

External links 
Athfest homepage
AthHalf homepage

Music festivals in Georgia (U.S. state)
Tourist attractions in Athens, Georgia